Chrysaeglia magnifica is a moth in the family Erebidae, subfamily Arctiinae (formerly treated as the subfamily Arctiinae). The species was first described by Francis Walker in 1862. It is found in India, Nepal, Sikkim, Borneo, Sulawesi and Taiwan.

Subspecies
Chrysaeglia magnifica magnifica
Chrysaeglia magnifica gigas Kishida, 1996 (Sulawesi)
Chrysaeglia magnifica taiwana Wileman, 1910 (Taiwan)

References

Moths described in 1862
Lithosiini
Moths of Borneo
Moths of Japan